Natalya Anatolyevna Petrusyova (born 2 September 1955) is a former speed skater.

Short biography
Natalya Petrusyova trained at Burevestnik. Competing for the Soviet Union, Petrusyova was a very successful skater – once Olympic Champion (on the 1,000 m), twice World Allround Champion, once World Sprint Champion, twice European Allround Champion, three times Soviet Allround Champion, twice Soviet Sprint Champion, and ten-time world record holder.

Petrusyova was awarded the Order of Friendship of Peoples in 1980. After her speed skating career had ended, Petrusyova became the senior speed skating coach at the Committee for Physical Culture and Sports in Moscow. At the 2006 Winter Olympics in Turin, she was the senior coach of the Russian speed skating team.

She married Vladimir Komarov, a Soviet Olympic speed skater.

Medals

An overview of medals won by Petrusyova at important championships she participated in, listing the years in which she won each:

World records
Over the course of her career, Petrusyova skated ten world records:

Personal records

References

External links
Natalya Petrusyova at SkateResults.com 
Personal records at Skatebase.com 

1955 births
Living people
Russian female speed skaters
Soviet female speed skaters
Olympic speed skaters of the Soviet Union
Olympic gold medalists for the Soviet Union
Olympic bronze medalists for the Soviet Union
Speed skaters at the 1976 Winter Olympics
Speed skaters at the 1980 Winter Olympics
Speed skaters at the 1984 Winter Olympics
Burevestnik (sports society) athletes
Olympic medalists in speed skating
World record setters in speed skating
Medalists at the 1984 Winter Olympics
Medalists at the 1980 Winter Olympics
World Allround Speed Skating Championships medalists
Honoured Masters of Sport of the USSR